Donisthorpe is a village in the North West Leicestershire district of Leicestershire, England, historically an exclave of Derbyshire.

History 
In 1086 Donisthorpe was part of the land given to Nigel of Stafford by William the Conqueror. It was then known as "Durandestorp"  which has been interpreted as 'the outlying settlement associated with Durand'.

From: A Topographical Dictionary of England, published by S Lewis, London, 1848. DONISTHORPE, an ecclesiastical district, in the union of Ashby-de-la-Zouch, partly in the parish of Nether Seal, W. division of the hundred of Goscote, N. division of the county of Leicester, and partly in the parishes of Church-Gresley, Measham, and Stretton-en-le-Fields, hundred of Repton and Gresley, S. division of the county of Derby, 3½ miles (S. W.) from Ashby-de-la-Zouch; containing about 1700 inhabitants, of whom 344 are in the hamlet of Donisthorpe. The district includes Oakthorpe and Moira; the Moira baths are celebrated for the cure of rheumatism, and there is a convenient hotel for the accommodation of visiters. The living is a perpetual curacy, in the patronage of the Bishop of Lichfield; net income, £150, with a parsonage-house. The impropriate tithes of Donisthorpe have been commuted for £87. The church, dedicated to St. John, was built and endowed in 1838, at an expense of £6000, chiefly by three maiden ladies of the name of Moore; it is a neat edifice, with a tower and pinnacles. A national school was built in 1840, by Sir John Cave Browne Cave, Bart., by whom, also, it is supported 

From: Kelly's Directory of Leicestershire & Rutland (1899) DONISTHORPE is a parish, formed in 1838, from the civil parishes of Church Gresley, Measham and Stretton-en-le-Field, and Ashby-de-la-Zouch and Seal, in Leicestershire, with a station on the Ashby and Nuneaton joint line of the Midland and London and North Western railways, 3 miles southwest from Ashby-de-la-Zouch, 8 southeast from Burton-upon-Trent and 114 northwest from London, in the Western division of the county, hundreds of Repton, Gresley and West Goscote, petty sessional division, union and county court district of Ashby-de-la-Zouch, rural deanery of Repton, archdeaconry of Derby and diocese of Southwell. Donisthorpe and Oakthorpe hamlets form a joint township in this ecclesiastical parish.

This parish, formerly in Derbyshire, was transferred to Leicestershire under the provisions of the Local Government (England and Wales) Act, 1888, by the counties of Derby and Leicester (Woodville &c.) Order, which came into operation Sept. 30, 1897.

The church of St John the Evangelist, erected in 1838, is a building of grey sandstone in the Perpendicular style, consisting of nave, west porch and an embattled western tower, with pinnacles, containing a clock and one bell: the nave was restored in 1889—90, and further restorations were effected in 1891, at a total cost of £700, and again in 1898: there are 500 sittings, 200 being free. The register dates from the year 1838. The living is a vicarage, net yearly value £214, including 17 acres of glebe, with residence, in the gift of the Bishop of Southwell, and held since 1885 by the Rev. Edward Bertram Lavies Theol. Assoc. K.C.L. Here are two Primitive Methodist chapels. A cemetery, containing 1 ½ acres was opened in 1875, and is under the control of the Parish Council of Oakthorpe and Donisthorpe and Urban District Council of Moira. There is a colliery, worked by Messrs. Checkland, Son and Williams, and the brewery of G. and W. F. Cooper. The principal landowners are the trustees of the late Lord Donington (d. 1895), Sir Mylles Cave-Brown-Cave bart. of Stretton-en-le-Field, the trustees of the late William Turner, Messrs. W. F. Cooper, S. Greaves, Drewry and some small freeholders. The soil is mixed; subsoil, chiefly clay. The chief crops are wheat, barley and oats. The area is 1,785 acres of land and 20 of water; rateable value, including Oakthorpe, £6,671; the population of the township in 1891 was 1,678, and of the parish 2,955.

National School (mixed), erected in 1830, for 82 children; average attendance, 82.

Wesleyan School (mixed), erected in 1875 & enlarged in 1894, for 142 children; average attendance, 130.A Primitive Methodist Chapel was built in 1852 and the Ordnance Survey map of 1884 shows one just north of the Engine Inn, the Mount Zion Chapel that was demolished in 2003. By 1908 there were two Primitive Methodist Chapels together with a Wesleyan chapel.

Donisthorpe Colliery closed in 1991. When the pit was operating the village had two post offices, five public houses, and 14 shops including a Coop Store (now the Scout Centre), a VG store, two butchers, a baker, a general store, a betting shop and a chip shop. At the time of pit closure in 1991 Donisthorpe contained four local shops, and a post office. Today the village has one shop (opened in 2014), and two pubs. Donisthorpe Miners' Welfare Centre closed during 2005, and since became a children's fun centre. The former mine site was developed into a housing estate. The colliery site became the Donisthorpe Woodland Park. Further sites of former employment included a shoe factory and brickyard.

THE GRANGE HOUSE
DONISTHORPE 

The house is well known in the local area to be haunted, nearly every visitor to the house speak and report of eerie happenings the most recent being in late 2022 in which the holiday makers actually left in the night as the disturbances had started to become violent. 

The house was originally a site that housed slave workers and their families, in the 1940’s a family of four was killed by a house fire in the staff quarters which spread throughout the house. 
Two separate encounters, members of the housekeeping have been known to have committed suicide upstairs in the adjoining bedroom. 

This is what is believed to be the route course of the ghost sightings. 

In May 2021, the local priest who heralds from Donisthorpe performed an exorcism on the house along with the owners. The mass was not deemed a success as Father Murphy (Rev) became unwell midway through the evening, there has not been any evidence to prove this was associated action to do with the ritual.

Other strange encounters have been recorded such as blurry figures appearing in group photo, particularly cold spots, mirrors moving by themselves and even physical bruising on one female who was celebrating her 50th birthday at the house.

Geography
A former mining village, it is just under  due east of Church Flatts Farm (near Coton-in-the-Elms, Derbyshire), the furthest point from coastal waters on the British mainland.

Together with Measham and Oakthorpe, the village became part of Leicestershire in 1897 when administrative counties were established and now lies within the civil parish of Oakthorpe and Donisthorpe.

The Derbyshire town of Swadlincote, four miles to the north, is usually given as the nearest town for the purposes of the postal service, though the village is marginally closer to Ashby, to the north-east. Surrounding villages include Moira, Oakthorpe, Overseal, Netherseal, Acresford and Albert Village.

Transport
Donisthorpe was served by the Ashby and Nuneaton Joint Railway which opened a station near Church Street in a deep cutting including three arch bridges. The line also had sidings to the colliery at Donisthorpe.

The station allowed passenger travel to Ashby-de-la-Zouch, Moira, Burton-Upon-Trent, Nuneaton, Hinckley and Coalville until 13 April 1934 when the line was closed to passengers. The line remained open to goods traffic until 1971, when the section from Measham to Shackerstone was closed by British Rail. The stub as far as Measham via Donisthorpe remained open to serve the colliery until 1981 when the stub near Overseal Junction was closed and lifted. The site was still traceable after closure of the stub but has since been filled in and forms a footpath from Moira to Spring Cottage via Donisthorpe and Moira.

Landmarks

St John the Evangelist Church was erected in 1938. It is a listed Grade II building, and within the ecclesiastical parish of Donisthorpe and Moira with Stretton-en-le-Field, Archdeaconry of Loughborough in the Diocese of Leicester. The last dedicated vicar vacated his position in 2006; the church is now part of a team ministry based in the nearby village of Measham. The vicarage house at Donisthorpe was sold but is also a Grade II building circa 1838

The church hall is opposite the church. It was originally the village school, donated by Sir John Cave, later converted to the church hall, and subsequently fell into disrepair and sold. The building has been converted to a private house.

Donisthorpe Memorial Park was opened as a War Memorial on 17 April 1920 by John Turner, High Sheriff of Leicestershire. The Grade II listed war memorial gateway was erected around 1922; subsequent names were added for the Second World War.

Donisthorpe Cemetery is registered with the Commonwealth War Graves Commission as having casualties (nine in total) from both the First and Second World Wars.

The late 17th-century timber framed thatched house, 58 New Street, was assessed in 1983 as a Grade II listed building. The house was badly damaged by fire in May 2011.

Donisthorpe Hall is early 18th Century and Grade II listed.

The Grange, 69 Church Street, a Grade II listed building, was thought to date from 1761 with early 19th-century additions. A survey in 2010 showed the building was built in the early 18th century, not 1761 as shown on the rainwater head. It has a fireplace dating from 1690 to 1730.

The Ashby Canal runs down the east side of the village.

Sport
Donisthorpe has two Sunday League men's football teams which play their home games at Ramscliffe Avenue. Founded in 2009 they currently play in the Burton & District Sunday Football League.

References

External links 

Surname Database - Explanation of surname
GENUKI page
Donisthorpe Colliery - Northern Mine Research Society
Donisthorpe Colliery History - I A Recordings
Donisthorpe Methodist Chapels - My Primitive Methodists
Donisthorpe Brickworks - Leicestershire Industrial History Society

Villages in Leicestershire